River Plate took part in the Uruguayan Primera División and Torneo Intermedio. At the same time, u-20 squad competed in 2018 U-20 Copa Libertadores and reached top three. This tournament was held in Uruguay from 10 to 24 February 2018. River Plate qualified for 2019 Copa Sudamericana. 

Pablo Tiscornia was removed on August 27 due to bad results.

Transfer Window

Summer 2018

In

Out

Winter 2018

In

Out

Squad

First team squad

Top Scorers 

Last update on Nov 8, 2018

Disciplinary Record 
Last updated on Nov 8,2018

Primera División

Apertura 2018

League table

Results by round

Matches 

1: El Tanque Sisley withdrew from the league due to outstanding debts.

Torneo Intermedio (Group B)

Group table

Results by round

Matches

Clausura 2018

League table

Results by round

Matches 

1: El Tanque Sisley withdrew from the league due to outstanding debts.

Overall

League table

2018 U-20 Copa Libertadores

Squad 

Coach:  Néstor Márquez 
Assistant:  Luis Romero

Group B

Matches

Group table

Semi-final

Third-place match

References

River Plate Montevideo seasons
River Plate